Ragini Shankar is an Indian violinist who performs Hindustani classical music and fusion. She is the daughter of Dr. Sangeeta Shankar and the granddaughter of the renowned Padmabhushan Dr. N. Rajam.

Early life 
Shankar began her training at the age of 4 and gave her first public performance as an 11-year-old. She plays violin in the Gayaki Ang.

Education 
Shankar excelled in her education in mechanical engineering and also holds a master's degree in music.

Performing career 
Shankar has performed in various prestigious festivals like the Europalia, MERU, Netherlands, Sawai Gandharva Bhimsen Festival, Dover Lane Music Conference, Saptak Festival of Music, Theatre de la Ville, Paris, Theatre de l'Alhambra, Geneva, Switzerland, MilapFest, Yaksha (festival), Aarohi for Pancham Nishad, Jaya Smriti organised by Hema Malini, Temple of Fine Arts, The Association of Performing Arts of India, T. N. Krishnan Foundation, and Bengal Music Foundation.

She has also performed abroad in the USA, Canada, the UK, Netherlands, Germany, France, Belgium, Hungary, Singapore, Malaysia and Dubai. Ragini gives lecture demonstrations and conducts workshops on a regular basis during her travels.

Shankar was a faculty at Whistling Woods International School of Music in Mumbai for 6 years and currently teaches at the Rajam School of Violin.

She is a part of the renowned Bollywood lyricist Irshad Kamil’s The Ink Band, a series  of poetry interwoven with music. She is also a part of an Indo-French musical project called Sangata, formed by the noted French composer Thierry Pecou and was covered in an article in Le Monde. Her recent collaborations include inStrings, an innovative fusion band, giving a new sound to popular Indian tunes. She has appeared on the platform of Talks at Google and Tedx for her talks on Indian music.

She resides in Mumbai.

Awards and honours

Aditya Birla Kala Kiran Award,presented by Rajashree Birla, 2019

Jashn-e-Youngistan presented by the Vice-President of India, Venkaiah Naidu, 2018

Jaya Smriti presented by film actress and dancer, Hema Malini, 2012

Discography

References

Violinists
Indian violinists
Living people
21st-century violinists
Year of birth missing (living people)